Mynderse-Frederick House is a historic home and tavern located at Guilderland in Albany County, New York.  It was built in 1802 and is a two-story frame house with rear ell in the Colonial style. It has a gable roof and features a recessed entrance with pilasters, transom and sidelights.  It was adapted for use as a tavern in the 1840s and is now used as a local history museum.

It was listed on the National Register of Historic Places in 1982.

See also
National Register of Historic Places listings in Albany County, New York

References

External links
 Mynderse-Frederick House - history and photos

Houses on the National Register of Historic Places in New York (state)
Houses completed in 1800
History museums in New York (state)
Houses in Albany County, New York
Museums in Albany County, New York
National Register of Historic Places in Albany County, New York